The Living Room Sessions may refer to:
 The Living Room Sessions (David Grisman, Frank Vignola, Robin Nolan and Michael Papillo album), 2007
 The Living Room Sessions (B. J. Thomas album), 2013
 The Living Room Sessions Part 1, a 2012 album by Ravi Shankar 
 The Living Room Sessions Part 2, a 2013 album by Ravi Shankar